Lists of Scottish counties by population include:

List of counties of Scotland by population in 1951
List of counties of Scotland by population in 1971